Holikachuk (own name: Doogh Qinag) was an Athabaskan language formerly spoken at the village of Holikachuk (Hiyeghelinhdi) on the Innoko River in central Alaska. In 1962, residents of  Holikachuk relocated to Grayling on the lower Yukon River. Holikachuk is intermediate between the Deg Xinag and Koyukon languages, linguistically closer to Koyukon but socially much closer to Deg Xinag. Though it was recognized by scholars as a distinct language as early as the 1840s, it was only definitively identified in the 1970s. Of about 180 Holikachuk people, only about 5 spoke the language in 2007. In March 2012, the last living fluent speaker of Holikachuk died in Alaska.

James Kari compiled a short dictionary of Holikachuk in 1978, but Holikachuk remains one of the least documented Alaska Native languages.

Examples 

  fish
 November (literally: 'month when the eels come [swim]')
  scales
 fish eggs
 Indian ice cream

References

External links
 Holikachuk Athabascan.  Alaska Native Language Center. Retrieved on 2007-03-14.

Northern Athabaskan languages
Indigenous languages of Alaska
Indigenous languages of the North American Subarctic
Languages extinct in the 2010s
2012 disestablishments in Alaska
Extinct languages of North America
Official languages of Alaska